Jessica Harmon (born December 27, 1985) is a Canadian actress and director. She portrayed Esrin in the Syfy science fiction web series Battlestar Galactica: The Face of the Enemy (2008–2009), FBI Agent Dale Bozzio in the CW supernatural drama series iZombie (2015–2019), and Niylah in the CW science fiction drama series The 100 (2016–2020).

Harmon co-starred as Megan Helms in the slasher film Black Christmas (2006), Heather Dalton in the science fiction horror film Hollow Man 2 (2006), and as Jill Eikland in the action horror film Dead Rising: Endgame (2016). In 2010, she won a Leo Award for Best Performance in a Music, Comedy, or Variety Program or Series for her role in the television pilot Wolf Canyon.

Early life
Jessica Harmon was born on December 27, 1985, in Barrie, Ontario, Canada. Her parents are director Allan Harmon and producer Cynde Harmon. Her brother is actor Richard Harmon, with whom she co-starred in the CW science fiction series The 100.

Filmography

Film

Television

Director

References

External links
Official site

Jessica Harmon at the Battlestar Wiki

Living people
1985 births
Canadian film actresses
People from Barrie
Actresses from Ontario
Canadian people of Italian descent